Robertina Mečevska (born 16 November 1984) is a Macedonian handball player who currently plays for ŽRK Vardar and for the North Macedonia women's national handball team. 

She plays on the position line player-pivot.

In the season 2010/11, playing for ŽRK Metalurg, she made it to the Last 16 of the Women's EHF Cup Winners' Cup.

References

External links
WRHL Profile
EHF CL Profile

1984 births
Living people
Macedonian female handball players
Sportspeople from Struga